HMS Royal Adelaide was a 104-gun first-rate ship of the line of the Royal Navy, launched on 28 July 1828 at Plymouth.

When first ordered in 1812 she was intended to be a second rate of 98 guns, but in the general reclassifications of 1817 she was reclassed as a first rate.

She was converted to serve as a depot ship in 1860, and was eventually sold out of the navy in 1905.

Notes

References

Lavery, Brian (2003) The Ship of the Line - Volume 1: The development of the battlefleet 1650–1850. Conway Maritime Press. .

External links
 

Ships of the line of the Royal Navy
Princess Charlotte-class ships of the line
Ships built in Plymouth, Devon
Coal hulks
1828 ships